The 2019–20 FA Cup (also known as the Football Association Challenge Cup) was the 139th edition of the oldest football tournament in the world. It was sponsored by Emirates and known as The Emirates FA Cup for sponsorship purposes. 

On 13 March 2020, it was agreed that the FA Cup, as well as the rest of professional football in England, would be suspended due to the COVID-19 pandemic. On 29 May 2020, The FA announced plans to restart the competition, with the rescheduled quarter-finals provisionally set to be played on 28 and 29 June and the final on 1 August. All remaining matches including the final were played behind closed doors. In an effort to "promote good, positive mental health for everyone", according to Prince William, the president of The Football Association, the 2020 FA Cup Final was known as the "Heads Up FA Cup Final", with "Heads Up" a campaign to promote mental health.

The defending champions, Premier League side Manchester City, were eliminated by Arsenal in the semi-finals on 18 July. Arsenal won the final 2–1 against Chelsea, their first win since 2017 and fourth in seven years, for their fourteenth FA Cup title.

Teams

Round and draw dates
For the first time, the Fifth Round fixtures were played midweek rather than on a weekend, to accommodate the "winter break".

Qualifying rounds

All of the competing teams that are not members of either the Premier League or English Football League competed in the qualifying rounds to secure one of 32 available places in the First Round Proper. The qualifying competition began with the Extra Preliminary Round on 10 August 2019. The fourth and final qualifying round was played over the weekend of 19 October 2019.

First Round Proper
The draw for the First Round Proper was held on 21 October 2019. The 32 winners from the qualifying competition joined the 47 clubs from League One and League Two in 39 ties played over the weekend of 9 November. Due to Bury's expulsion from the competition, Chichester City (the final team drawn) were given a bye to the Second Round Proper. Chichester are one of two Level 8 teams that reached the first round along with Maldon & Tiptree, the lowest ranked teams left in the competition.

Second Round Proper
The draw for the Second Round Proper was held on 11 November 2019. The 39 winners of the First Round Proper and bye recipients Chichester City played in 20 Second Round Proper ties on the weekend of 30 November. This round included two teams from level 8, Chichester City and Maldon & Tiptree, who were the lowest-ranked teams still in the competition.

Third Round Proper

The draw for the Third Round Proper was held on 2 December 2019. The 20 Second Round winners joined the 20 Premier League and 24 EFL Championship clubs in 32 ties to be played across the weekend of 4–6 January 2020. This round included two teams from level 5, AFC Fylde and Hartlepool United, who were the lowest-ranked teams still in the competition.

All thirty-two matches kicked off one minute late to encourage fans to take one minute to think about their mental health, and to broadcast a film narrated by FA president Prince William about this issue.

Fourth Round Proper
The draw was held on 6 January 2020, ahead of the Arsenal v Leeds United match. The ties were played between 24 and 27 January 2020. Northampton Town of League Two (level 4) were the lowest-ranked team to compete in this round.

Fifth Round Proper

The draw was held on 27 January 2020, ahead of the AFC Bournemouth v Arsenal fourth round match. The ties were played in midweek during the week commencing Monday 2 March 2020. From this round there would be no replays; all ties would head to extra time and, if necessary, penalties to decide the team to advance in the event of a draw.	

The lowest ranked side to play in the fifth round was Portsmouth of League One (level 3).

Quarter-finals
The draw for the quarter-finals took place on 4 March 2020. All teams playing in this round were from the Premier League, the first all-Premier League quarter-finals since 2005–06.

The ties were due to be played on 21 and 22 March 2020, before being postponed on 13 March 2020 due to the COVID-19 pandemic. The fixtures were revised to the 27 and 28 June 2020 following the end of the suspension. All ties were played behind closed doors.

As a gesture of solidarity following the murder of George Floyd, the 'Black Lives Matter' badge is used by all players from this round on. The FA also gave their support for any player who chooses to "take a knee" before or during matches. In addition, the NHS tribute badge was also used at all kits for the remainder of the season. All teams but Sheffield United and Newcastle United donned both badges at the front side, the others put the BLM badge below the players' number at the back of the shirt.

Semi-finals
The semi-finals were played on 18 and 19 July 2020 and were shown on BT Sport and BBC Sport. Both games were played at Wembley Stadium. The draw was held during half-time of the Newcastle United–Manchester City quarter-final match and was conducted by Alan Shearer.

Final

The 2020 FA Cup Final was played on 1 August 2020 and was shown live on BT Sport and BBC Sport. Wembley Stadium hosted the game as usual.

Top scorers

Television rights

Notes

References

 
FA Cup seasons
FA Cup
FA Cup
FA Cup